This is a list of German brigades in World War II. The list aims to include all brigade-level military formations of the German Wehrmacht and Waffen-SS during World War II.

Brigades, in German army parlance prior to 1944, generally designated formations of two regiments from the same branch of arms. For instance,  contained the Panzer Regiments 3 and 4. The usage of the term shifted in the army after 30 May 1944, when it was redefined to apply to singular strengthened regiments.

Heer

Infantry brigades 
The number of infantry brigades increased notably after 30 May 1944, when the previously-accepted meaning of brigade, group of two regiments of the same branch, was changed to instead designate a singular strengthened regiment. In such a fashion, the Grenadier Regiments 193, 308 and 503 in Finland became Grenadier Brigades. Grenadier Brigade 761 was an emergency formation formed from Finland veterans in Danzig in July 1944, and the Grenadier Brigades 1131 through 1136 were rapidly raised in various military districts in late July 1944, to be used as autonomous military formations.

Assault brigades

Gebirgsjäger brigades

Fortress brigades

Replacement brigades

Rifle/Panzergrenadier brigades 
The Rifle Regiments and Cavalry Rifle Regiments of the Wehrmacht mobile troops, as well as the brigades overseeing them, had their own numbering, separate from the more conventional infantry forces.

In the 1939 basic layout of a Panzer Division, each division was equipped with a Rifle Brigade, which in turn was the superior unit of one Rifle Regiment of three battalions and of a separate motorcycle battalion. This basic layout was overhauled in 1940; from then on, Rifle Brigades generally oversaw two Rifle Regiments instead of one, and each Rifle Regiment had two battalions each instead of three, thus bringing the number of total rifle battalions in a Rifle Brigade from three to four, but dropping the motorcycle battalion.

On 15 October 1942, the motorized infantry formations, including all previous Rifle Brigades, were given the new designation "Panzergrenadier", becoming Panzergrenadier Brigades.

Panzer brigades 

In the initial formation and conception of the German Panzerwaffe, the Panzer Brigade played an administrative role in the concept of its respective superior unit, the Panzer Division. In the prewar discussions, advocates of the establishment of Panzer Division (such as Heinz Guderian) faced opposition by a set of officers (such as Ludwig Beck) that favored independent Panzer Brigades and opposed division-level armored units.

To each Panzer Division was assigned a Panzer Brigade, which in turn contained two Panzer Regiments (each with two Panzer Detachments, for a total of four detachments in the Panzer Brigade). Additionally, a 1939 Panzer Division was supposed to be equipped with a Rifle Brigade (see above), a motorcycle battalion, a reconnaissance detachment, an engineer battalion, a panzer signals detachment, and a divisional services unit.

Only the original three Panzer Divisions (1st, 2nd, 3rd) actually contained all necessary parts in September 1939 (and even they did not receive the complete number of vehicles planned), and the divergences between the different divisions only increased as the war progressed. For instance, the 6th, 7th, 8th, and 9th Panzer Divisions (formed from the four Light Divisions after the Invasion of Poland) did not contain Panzer Brigades at all, instead opting for a single Panzer Regiment with three instead of two Panzer Detachments.

The collapse of Army Group Centre in 1944 (Operation Bagration), soon followed by the collapse of Army Group South Ukraine (Second Jassy–Kishinev offensive), resulted in the emergency formation of several new Panzer Brigades, numbered 101 through 113.

Panzerjäger brigades

Reconnaissance brigades 
Wehrmacht reconnaissance forces were usually organized well below the brigade level, for instance in the form of Kradschützen Battalions or Panzer Reconnaissance Detachments. The sole exceptions were four formations that were largely based around the idea of bicycle infantry. Two such brigades, the Fast Brigades 20 and 30, were first deployed in the German occupation zones in Belgium and the Netherlands in May 1943.

Cavalry brigades

Army artillery brigades

Sturmgeschütz brigades 
The army had fielded dedicated Sturmgeschütz units starting with the Sturmgeschütz Detachments that were first deployed on 7 February 1941. In February 1944, those Sturmgeschütz Detachments with three batteries received the designation of Sturmgeschütz Brigades. Some of those brigades (those that were additionally equipped with an escort company) were later again redesignated to become Army Assault Artillery Brigades (see below).

A Sturmgeschütz brigade contained (at least) three batteries, each typically with 10 to 14 assault guns.

Army assault artillery brigades

Army anti-aircraft artillery brigades 
The army flak artillery had become its own branch of the Wehrmacht artillery on 15 June 1941, after first army flak artillery detachments had started to see deployment in February 1941. In January 1945, ten army flak artillery brigades, numbered 501 through 510, were established. Each of them consisted of two battalions (or a total of ten companies), and several of them incorporated preexisting formations, the Infantry Flak Battalions.

Rocket launcher brigades

Engineer brigades 
This list includes engineer brigades, Volkspionier brigades, army construction engineer brigades, blockade brigades, engineer blockade brigades and railroad engineer brigades.

Supply brigades

Security brigades

Kriegsmarine

Naval infantry brigades 
As the Kriegsmarine was not initial designed to field centralized large-scale naval infantry formations, German naval infantry was usually organized below brigade level prior to 1944 (for example in the form of autonomous Naval Rifle Battalions). Two exceptions existed: Naval Brigade Weber was formed in August 1944 to enable naval infantry forces in German-occupied southwestern France to withdraw and to escape the Allied invasion forces. Subsequently, the formation of compact naval infantry formations was prepared at the division level. To that end, a short-lived brigade, the Naval Rifle Brigade North, was formed in November 1944. It was eventually integrated into the first of the newly-formed naval infantry divisions in early 1945.

Naval anti-aircraft brigades

Luftwaffe

Air force infantry brigades

Air force Fallschirmjäger brigades

Air force mobile brigades

Air force parachute Sturmgeschütz brigades

Air force anti-aircraft brigades

Air force air space protection brigades

Air force construction brigades

Air force NSKK brigades 
Two brigades of the National Socialist Motor Corps (NSKK) were formed under the supervision of the Luftwaffe.

Schutzstaffel (SS)

SS infantry brigades

SS Panzergrenadier brigades

SS cavalry brigades

SS panzer brigades

SS rocket launcher brigades

SS construction brigades 
The SS construction brigades were formed from forced laborers (usually male non-Jewish concentration camp inmates) starting in late 1942. These brigades were frequently sent to major German cities damaged by war for clearance wars, and satellite camps of the concentration camps they were originally interned in were often formed to house them.

Reichsarbeitsdienst (RAD)

See also 

 List of World War II military units of Germany
 List of German army groups in World War II
 List of German corps in World War II
 List of German divisions in World War II
 List of Waffen-SS units

References 

Brigades
Brigades
!
Brigades
!